Arnold Jerome Berleant (born 4 March 1932) is an American scholar and author who is active in both philosophy and music.

 
Arnold Berleant was born in Buffalo, New York.  He received his advanced musical education at the Eastman School of Music and his doctorate in philosophy at the State University of New York at Buffalo.  He is Professor of Philosophy (Emeritus) at Long Island University, former Secretary-General and Past President of the International Association of Aesthetics, and former Secretary-Treasurer of the American Society for Aesthetics. His books and articles in philosophy focus on aesthetics, environmental aesthetics, and ethics. Arnold Berleant is the founding editor of Contemporary Aesthetics, an international on-line journal of contemporary aesthetic theory, research, and application. His body of work has been digitized and is part of the Archival & Manuscript Collection in the University at Buffalo Library.

Life and work

As a philosopher Berleant has written on aspects of both aesthetic theory and the arts.  These include ontological and metaphysical issues, basic theoretical questions such as appreciation and aesthetic experience, and explorations of music, architecture, painting and literature.  His first book, The Aesthetic Field:  A Phenomenology of Aesthetic Experience (1970), established the concept of the aesthetic field as a contextual framework within which questions in aesthetics and the arts can be most fully illuminated.  Much of his subsequent work has focused on environmental aesthetics, attending both to general issues and to specific kinds of environment.  The aesthetics of environment is a theme that he has elaborated and extended in much of his writing.  In Art and Engagement (1991), Berleant exemplified the usefulness of the concept of the aesthetic field by applying it to a range of arts – landscape painting, architecture and environmental design, literature, music, dance, and film. Emerging from these original studies was the recognition that the different arts evoke experiences with their own claims to reality.  Moreover, these experiences exhibit an intense, active perceptual involvement that he calls "aesthetic engagement," which belies the traditional claim of aesthetic disinterestedness.

The innovative concept of aesthetic engagement leads to new perspectives on a variety of traditional esthetic topics, including metaphorical language, urban design, music, and metaphysics, and opens less traditional topics, such as virtual reality and social interaction to aesthetic analysis.
The body of Berleant's work challenges the traditional view of philosophical aesthetics, which posits "disinterestedness" as foundational in aesthetic experience.  Berleant draws upon both phenomenology and pragmatism for an opposing theory of aesthetic perception based on the notion of engagement.

Education
State University of New York College, Fredonia, N.Y., 1949-1951.  Major:  music education; major instrument:  piano
B.M. with distinction, Eastman School of Music of the University of Rochester, 1953.  Major:  music theory; major instrument:  piano 
M.A., Eastman School of Music, 1955.  Major:  music theory; major instrument:  piano.  Thesis:  "The Fugue in the Orchestral Works of Bartók" 
Ph.D., State University of New York at Buffalo, 1962.  Major:  philosophy.  Dissertation:  "Logic and Social Doctrine:  Dewey's Methodological Approach to Social Philosophy."

Honors and awards
Liber Amicorum for Arnold Berleant. in Popular Inquiry, Vol. 10. 2022
Doctor of Fine Arts (Hon.), The Rhode Island School of Design, 2011
Honorary Guest Professor, Wuhan University, P.R. China, 2004–2007
Honorary Life Member, International Association for Aesthetics, 2002
Membre du Comité d'Honneur de la Société française d'esthétique, 2000
Honorary Member, Sydney Society for Literature and Aesthetics, 1999
Honorary Member, Finnish Society of Aesthetics,  1997
President, International Association for Aesthetics, 1995–1998
Long Island University Trustees Award for Scholarly Achievement, 1992 for Art and Engagement.

Works
The Social Aesthetics of Human Environments: Critical Themes (Bloomsbury, Forthcoming).
Aesthetics beyond the Arts:  New and Recent Essays (Aldershot: Ashgate, 2012).  .
Sensibility and Sense:  The Aesthetic Transformation of the Human World (Exeter:  Imprint Academic, 2010).  .
Re-thinking Aesthetics, Rogue Essays on Aesthetics and the Arts (Aldershot: Ashgate, 2004).  .  Polish trans., (Universitas, 2007); Chinese trans. (Wuhan University Press, 2010).
Aesthetics and Environment, Theme and Variations on Art and Culture (Aldershot: Ashgate, 2005).  .
Living in the Landscape:  Toward an Aesthetics of Environment (Lawrence:  University Press of Kansas, 1997).  .
The Aesthetics of Environment (Philadelphia:  Temple University Press, 1992.  Paperback edition, 1994).  .  Greek trans., (Athens: Michelis Institute, 2004).  Chinese trans. (Hunan Publishing Group, 2006).
Art and Engagement (Philadelphia:  Temple University Press, 1991.  Paperback edition, 1991.) .  Chinese trans.,(Beijing:  The Commercial Press, 2011.)
The Aesthetic Field:  A Phenomenology of Aesthetic Experience (Springfield, Ill.:  C. C. Thomas 1970).  2nd edition (Cybereditions  2001).  
The Fugue in the Orchestral Works of Bartók (Rochester:  University of Rochester Press, 1958).  Microcards.

Essays
Eugene Hughes and Arnold Berleant, "Aesthetic engagement as a pathway to mental health and wellbeing,"  Oxford Handbook of Mental Health and Contemporary Western Aesthetics (Oxford University Press, forthcoming).
"Duchampian Reflections on Descartes," Festschrift  Liber Amicorum for Arnold Berleant.  Popular Inquiry, Vol. 10. (2022): 6-10. https://static1.squarespace.com/static/58763ec0c534a5e7e2b65fe2/t/6221d2810adb752788b1c6af/1646383746421/Popular+inquiry_Vol10_2022_1_Berleant_def.pdf 
Podcast on Ageing, with Michael Alpert:  
https://omny.fm/shows/experience/experience-ageing-with-arnold-berleant-and-michael
Spotify (popular website/app) link:
https://open.spotify.com/episode/0bkWfZXwQAot4p9Wt3ljA4
"The Sublime Troubles of Postmodernism," Arts & Cultural Studies Review (Przegląd Kulturoznawczy), 4/2021. 
"Aesthetic Engagement in Video Dance," in The Bloomsbury Handbook of Dance and Philosophy, ed. R. Farinas and J. Van Camp (Bloomsbury, 2021). http://dx.doi.org/10.17613/M6R20RW1W
"Aesthetics and the Arts of Engagement," forthcoming in Roczniki Kulturoznawcze (Annals of Cultural Studies), 2021/1.
"A Philosophical Retrospective," Contemporary Aesthetics, Special Volume 9 (2021) Aesthetic Engagement and Sensibility: Reflections on Arnold Berleant's Work.
"Reflections," Contemporary Aesthetics, Special Volume 9 (2021) Aesthetic Engagement and Sensibility: Reflections on Arnold Berleant's Work.
"Whose Everyday?  On the Cultural Aesthetics of Everyday Life," forthcoming in Everydayness: Contemporary Aesthetic Approaches ed. by Adrián Kvokačka and Lisa Giombini.
"The Transformations of Aesthetic Theory," in António dos Santos Queirós, ed., Examining a New Paradigm of Heritage With Philosophy, Economy, and Education, IGI Global, 2020.
Preface to Philosophy of Landscape: To Think, Walk, Build, ed. Adriana Veríssimo Serrão (Leuven University Press), 2019.
"Reflections on the Aesthetics of Violence," Contemporary Aesthetics, guest editor Emmanouil Aretoulakis, Special Volume 7 (2019). http://dx.doi.org/10.17613/aph9-1969
"The Subversion of Beauty," Chinese translation by Zhao Yu, South China Academics (University of Macau), 2018. http://dx.doi.org/10.17613/M64B2X47X
"Thoreau's Poetics of Nature," in Ecocritical Aesthetics, ed. Peter Quigley and Scott Slovic (Bloomington, IN:  Indiana University Press, 2018), pp. 41-50. http://dx.doi.org/10.17613/M6CP3K 
"Whose Everyday?  On the Cultural Aesthetics of Everyday Life," panel on Saito, Aesthetics of the Familiar, ASA, Toronto, 11 Oct 2018.  Read by Larry Shiner. 
"Further Ruminations on Music as an Exemplary Art," New Sound, International Journal of Music, Issue 50, (2017), 129-137.
"Objects into Persons: The Way to Social Aesthetics,: in Aesthetics Between Art and Society: Perspectives of Arnold Berleant's Postkantian Aesthetics of Engagement, Espes Vol. 6, No. 2 (2017), 9-18.
Interview in Rethinking Modernism and the Built Environment, ed. Almantas Samalavicius (Cambridge Scholars Publ., 2017).
"Aesthetic Engagement in Video Dance," Engagement: Symposium of Philosophy and Dance, Texas State University San Marcos, Texas 8–10 September 2016.
"Art, Terrorism, and the Negative Sublime," Reprinted in Artenol, Winter 2016, 24-31.  http://dx.doi.org/10.17613/M6VQ2S91X 
"Some Questions for Ecological Aesthetics," Environmental Philosophy, (Spring 2016), 123-135; Chinese trans. by Li Sujie, Dong Yue Tribune, No. 4, 2016.
"The Co-optation of Sensibility and the Subversion of Beauty," Filozofski vestnik XXXVI/1, 2015 (Lljubljana). Special issue on everyday aesthetics. In Slovenian and English. Also in Pragmatism Today, Vol. 6 No.2 (Winter 2015), 38-47.
"Environmental Aesthetics West and East," in symposium on environmental aesthetics in China and the West, Journal of Heilongjang University (Seeking Truth) Vol. 1 (China, 2015). In Chinese.
"Thoreau's Poetics of Nature," No Beauty, No Peace: Rethinking the Role of Beauty and Immediacy in Ecocritical Criticism, ed. Peter Quigley and Scott Slovik (Bloomington, IN: Indiana University Press, 2018), pp. 41–50. 
"Ideas for an Ecological Aesthetics," in Xiangzhan Cheng, Arnold Berleant, Paul Gobster, Xinhao Wang, eds.,  Ecological Aesthetics and Ecological Planning, (Henan People's Press, 2014), pp. 54–72. 
"The Cultural Aesthetics of Environment," in Annals for Aesthetics, Fiftieth Anniversary Issue (New York: Fordham University Press, 2014), pp. 61–72.(Presented at the annual conference of the International Association of Environmental Philosophy, Montreal, 7 November 2010.)  
"Sensibility:  The Growth of an Aesthetic," "What Titles Don't Tell," and "Engaging Dewey:  The Legacy of Dewey's Aesthetics" in Sztuka i Filozofia, Vol. 37/2011.  Special issue devoted to the work of Arnold Berleant, with contributions by Polish, Chinese, and American scholars. 165 pages. 
"The Aesthetics of Politics," in The Primacy of Aesthetic Experience in Late Modernity (Universitas, 2010), Polish trans., forthcoming.  Chinese translation forthcoming in journal, Marxism Aesthetics Research, 2011.  Another Chinese translation forthcoming in a collection on environmental aesthetics ed. by W. H. Chen (Wuhan University Press).
"The Human Touch and the Beauty of Nature," in Rethinking Landscape by Ian Thompson (Routledge, 2009).
"On Judging Scenic Beauty," in Aesthetic Culture: Essays in Honour of Yrjö Sepänmaa, ed. S. Knuuttila, E. Sevänen, and R. Turunen ( Maahenki Co:  2007). pp. 57–75.    
"Judging Architecture," in Poreia (Athens:  National Technical University, 2007), pp. 144–151.  Festschrift in honor of Dionysis Zivas.
"The Soft Side of Stone,"  International Conference on the Aesthetics of Stone and Rock, Koli, Finland, 14 June 2007.  Published in Finnish in Jalo kivi (Helsinki:  Maahenki Oy, 2010) and in English in Environmental Philosophy, Vol. 4, Nos. 1 & 2 (Spring & Fall, 2007).
"Distant Cities:  Thoughts on an Aesthetics of Urbanism," paper given at the International Institute of Applied Aesthetics (IIAA) international summer school in environmental aesthetics and philosophy on Urban Spaces, Everyday Experience and Well-Being, Lahti, Finland, 19 June 2006.  
"Ideas for a Social Aesthetic," in The Aesthetics of Everyday Life, Andrew Light and Jonathan M. Smith (eds.).  (New York: Columbia University Press, 2005),  pp. 23–38.
"The Aesthetic in Place," in Constructing Place, ed. Sarah Menin (New York: Routledge, 2003), Ch.1, pp. 41–54.
"Is There Life in Virtual Space," in The Virtual Environment, ed. Pauline von Bonsdorff and Arto Haapala (Lahti, Finland: International Institute of Applied Aesthetics). 
"Notes for a Cultural Aesthetic," Koht ja Paik / Place and Location, ed. Virve Sarapik, Kadri Tüür, and Mari Laanemets (Eesti Kunstiakadeemia, 2002), pp. 19–26.  
"Re-thinking Aesthetics," in Filozofski vestnik, XX (2/1999 - XIV ICA), Proceedings of the XIV International Congress of Aesthetics (Ljubljana, Slovenia, pp. 25–33.
"Environmental Aesthetics," for The Encyclopedia of Aesthetics, ed. M. Kelly ( Oxford University Press, 1998).
"Environment and the Body," in Place and Embodiment, ed. P.T. Karjalainen & P.von Bonsdorff (Lahti: University of Helsinki, 1997), pp. 69–78.
"The Critical Aesthetics of Disney World," Journal of Applied Philosophy, 11/2 (1994), 171-180.  As "Deconstructing Disney World," translated into Chinese by Niu Hong Bao and published in Wen She Zhe (Literature, History, and Philosophy, a journal in P.R. China), 1994/2, 92-103.  Reprinted in The Aesthetics of Human Environments, edited by Arnold Berleant and Allen Carlson (Peterborough, Ont: Broadview, 2007).

Editor
Perspectives on Contemporary Aesthetics. Co-edited with Yuriko Saito.  (RISD Shortrun Publications, 2016). .
Contemporary Aesthetics, Editor-in-Chief (2003-2017).
Environment and the Arts; Perspectives on Art and Environment.  Editor.  (Aldershot: Ashgate, 2002).  .  Chinese trans., Liu Yu, (Chongqing Publishing House, 2007).
The Aesthetics of Human Environments.  Co-edited with Allen Carlson.  (Peterborough, Ont.:  Broadview, 2007).  .
The Aesthetics of Natural Environments.  Co-edited with Allen Carlson.  (Peterborough, Ont.:  Broadview, 2004).  
The Journal of Aesthetics and Art Criticism, 56/2 (1998).  Special issue on environmental aesthetics. Guest co-editor (with Allen Carlson).
The Ethical Factor in Business Decisions (Brookville, N.Y.:  C. W. Post Center of Long Island University, 1982).  Editor.

Journal Issues on Berleant's Work
Contemporary Aesthetics, "Aesthetic Engagement and Sensibility:  Reflections on Arnold Berleant's Work."  Special Volume 9 (2021) edited by Bogna J. Obidzińska.  English translation of special issue of Sztuka y Filozofia, Vol. 37/2010. Espes Journal, "Aesthetics Between Art and Society: Perspectives of Arnold Berleant's Postkantian Aesthetics of Engagement," Vol. 6, No. 2, edited by Aleksandra Lukaszewicz Alcaraz (2017).Sztuka i Filozofia, Vol. 37/2010, edited by Bogna J. Obidzińska.

Notes
University of Buffalo had just become a unit of the State University of New York at Buffalo when Berleant received his doctorate.  It is now called The University at Buffalo.Contemporary Aesthetics, is an international, interdisciplinary, peer- and blind-reviewed online journal  of contemporary theory, research, and application in aesthetics. (ISSN 1932-8478)
Berleant first introduced the term 'engagement' in "The Experience and Criticism of Art,"  Sarah Lawrence Journal'', Winter 1967, pp. 55–64.

References

External links 

imprint-academic.com
Ashgate Publishing
broadviewpress.com
kansaspress.ku.edu
Temple University Press
cybereditions.com
 Arnold Berleant's website
 Contemporary Aesthetics
University at Buffalo Library Archival & Manuscript Collections -Arnold Berleant Collection

1932 births
American musicologists
American non-fiction writers
Living people
Philosophers from New York (state)
Philosophers of art
Writers from Buffalo, New York